Nicole Loiselle (born March 8, 1954) is a Canadian politician. She represented the electoral districts of Saint-Henri from 1989 to 1994 and Saint-Henri–Sainte-Anne in the National Assembly of Quebec from 1994 to 2007 as a member of the Quebec Liberal Party.
Loiselle was born in Montreal, Quebec. Prior to entering electoral politics, Loiselle was a departmental assistant to federal Members of Parliament Don Johnston from 1980 to 1984 and David Berger from 1984 to 1988. She then became president of her own real estate firm.

External links
 

1954 births
French Quebecers
Living people
Politicians from Montreal
Quebec Liberal Party MNAs
Women MNAs in Quebec
21st-century Canadian politicians
21st-century Canadian women politicians